Mark Hallett may refer to:

Mark Hallett (art historian), British art historian
 Mark Hallett (artist), American illustrator specializing in paleoart